The archery competitions at the 2017 Southeast Asian Games in Kuala Lumpur took place at Merdeka Square in Kuala Lumpur.

The 2017 Games featured competitions in ten events (men 4 events, women 4 events and mixed 2 events ).

Men's individual compound

Qualification round

Knockout round

Women's individual compound

Qualification round

Knockout round

Men's team compound

Seeding round

Knockout round

Women's team compound

Seeding round

Knockout round

Mixed team compound

Seeding round

Knockout round

Men's individual recurve

Ranking round

Knockout round

Finals

Section 1

Section 2

Women's individual recurve

Ranking round

Knockout round

Finals

Section 1

Section 2

Men's team recurve

Ranking round

Knockout round

Finals

Section 1

Section 2

Women's team recurve

Ranking round

Knockout round

Finals

Section 1

Section 2

Mixed team recurve

Ranking round

Knockout round

Finals

Section 1

Section 2

References

External links
  

R
2017 in women's archery